Esteban Boza (born 22 August 1966) is a Peruvian sports shooter. He competed at the 1984 Summer Olympics and the 1996 Summer Olympics.

References

External links
 

1966 births
Living people
Peruvian male sport shooters
Olympic shooters of Peru
Shooters at the 1984 Summer Olympics
Shooters at the 1996 Summer Olympics
Place of birth missing (living people)
20th-century Peruvian people
21st-century Peruvian people